Carlo Martinenghi (1894 – September  1944) was an Italian long-distance runner who competed at the 1920 Summer Olympics and the 1924 Summer Olympics.

References

External links
 

1894 births
1944 deaths
Athletes from Milan
Athletes (track and field) at the 1920 Summer Olympics
Athletes (track and field) at the 1924 Summer Olympics
Italian male cross country runners
Italian male long-distance runners
Italian male steeplechase runners
Olympic athletes of Italy
Olympic cross country runners